Arie is a masculine given name.

As a Dutch name, Arie (pronounced ) is generally a short form of Adrianus, but sometimes also of Arend or Arent, Arnout or Arnoud, or even Aaron. 

As a Hebrew, Jewish, or Israeli name, Arie (pronounced ) is a transliteration of the Hebrew word or name אריה, which means lion. Other transliterations include Arieh, Aryeh, and Ari.

People with the name include:

Arie Alter (born 1961), Israeli footballer
Arie Altman (1902–1982), Israeli politician (Aryeh) 
 (1903–1982), Dutch composer
Arie Aroch (1908–1974), Israeli painter
Arie van Beek (born 1951), Dutch music teacher and conductor
Arie Belldegrun (born 1949), Israeli-American urologic oncologist (Aryeh)
Arie Bieshaar (1899–1965), Dutch footballer (Adrianus)
Arie Bijl (1908–1945), Dutch theoretical physicist and resistance member 
Arie Bijvoet (1891–1976), Dutch footballer
Arie Bodek (born 1947), American experimental particle physicist and professor
Arie van den Brand (born 1951), Dutch GreenLeft politician
Arie van de Bunt (born 1969), Dutch water polo player (Arend)
Arie Carpenter or "Aunt Arie" (1885–1978), American woman portrayed in the play FirefoxArie Deri (born 1959), Israeli politician (Aryeh)
Arie van Deursen (1931–2011), Dutch historian
 (1927–1998), Dutch computer scientist (Adrianus)
Arie Dvoretzky (1918–2008), Russian-born Israeli mathematician (Aryeh)
Arie Eldad (born 1950), Israeli politician (Aryeh)
Arie Evegroen (1905–1988), Dutch schipper who prevented a flood in 1953
Arie Freiberg (born 1949), Australian legal academic
Arie Gamliel (born 1957), Israeli Olympic long distance runner
Arie van Gemert (born 1929), Dutch football referee
Arie de Geus (born 1930), Dutch business executive at Royal Dutch/Shell
Arie Gluck (1930–2016), Israeli Olympic middle distance runner (also known as Arie Gill-Glick)
Arie Lev Gruzman (born 1970), Israeli chemist
Arie de Graaf (1939–1995), Dutch track cyclist 
Arie de Graaf (born 1947), Dutch politician
Arie Gur'el (1918–2017), Polish-born mayor of Haifa, Israel (Aryeh)
Arie Jan Haagen-Smit (1900–1977), Dutch chemist (Adrianus)
Arie Haan (born 1948), Dutch football player and coach (Arend)
Arie Nicolaas Habermann (1932–1993), Dutch computer scientist
Arie den Hartog (born 1941), Dutch road bicycle racer
Arie Hassink (born 1950), Dutch road bicycle racer (Arend)
Arie Haviv (born 1956), Israeli footballer
Arie Heijkoop (1883–1929), Dutch politician
Arie Hershkowitz (born ca. 1960), Israeli urban planner
Arie van Houwelingen (born 1931), Dutch bicycle racer
Arie Irawan (1990–2019), Malaysian golfer
Arie Itman, Canadian heavy metal singer and guitarist
Arie de Jong (1865–1957), Dutch physician, linguist and Volapük enthusiast
Arie de Jong (fencer) (1882–1966), Dutch fencer (Adrianus)
Arie Kaan (1901–1991), Dutch hurdler
Arie Kaplan, American writer and comedian
Arie E. Kaufman (born 1948), American computer scientist
Arie Klaase (1903–1983), Dutch long-distance runner
Arie L. Kopelman (born 1938), American businessman and philanthropist
Arie Kosto (born 1938), Dutch State Secretary for Justice
Arie Kouandjio (born 1992), American football player
Arie W. Kruglanski (born 1939), American social psychologist 
Arie Andries Kruithof (1909–1993), Dutch physicist
Arie Frederik Lasut (1909–1993), Indonesian geologist and revolutionary
Arie Lamme (1748–1801), Dutch landscape painter and poet
Arie Johannes Lamme (1812–1900), Dutch painter and museum director
Arie van Leeuwen (1910–2000), Dutch hurdler
Arie van Lent (born 1970), Dutch footballer active in Germany
Arie Loef (born 1969), Dutch speed skater
Arie Luyendyk (born 1953), Dutch auto racing driver
Arie Luyendyk Jr. (born 1981), Dutch-American auto racing driver; son of the above
Arie Machnes (born 1921), Israeli footballer
Arie Maliniak (born 1949), Israeli basketball player and coach
Arie Nehemkin (born 1925), Israeli Minister of Agriculture (Aryeh)
Arie van Os (born 1937), Dutch businessman and financial director
Arie Pais (born 1930), Dutch politician and economist (Aäron)
 (1906–1934), Dutch motorcycle racer
Arie Posin (born ca. 1972), Israeli-born American film director and screenwriter 
Arie Radler (born 1943), Israeli footballer and manager
Arie Zeev Raskin (born 1976), Chief Rabbi of Cyprus
Arie Reich (born 1959), Israeli legal scholar
Arie Rip (born 1941), Dutch social scientist
Arie Schans (born 1953), Dutch football manager
Arie Selinger (born 1937), Israeli volleyball coach (Aryeh)
Arie Shapira (born 1943), Israeli composer and music researcher
Arie Slob (born 1961), Dutch politician
Arie Smit (born 1916), Dutch-born Indonesian painter (Adrianus)
Arie van der Stel (1894–1986), Dutch cyclist
Arie Supriyatna (born 1984), Indonesian footballer
Arie Van de Moortel (1918–1976), Belgian violist and composer
Arie Vardi (born 1937), Israeli classical pianist
Arie van der Velden (1881–1967), Dutch sailor
Arie Vermeer (1922–2013), Dutch footballer (Adrianus)
Arie Verveen (born 1976), Irish actor
Arie van Vliet (1916–2001), Dutch cyclist and 1936 Olympic champion
Arie de Vois (1632–1680), Dutch Golden Age painter
Arie Vooren (1923–1988), Dutch racing cyclist
Arie Vos (born 1976), Dutch motorcycle racer
Arie Vosbergen (1882–1918), Dutch middle and long-distance runner
Arie de Vroet (1918–1999), Dutch footballer
Arie Wilner, nom de guerre of Izrael Chaim Wilner (1916–1943), Polish-Jewish resistance fighter
Arie de Winter (born 1915), Dutch footballer (Arend)
Arie Zaban (born 1961), Israeli Professor of Chemistry and President of Bar-Ilan University
Arie Zwart (1903–1981), Dutch painter (Adrianus'')
Arie Hogendoorn (born 2003), Anglo/Dutch aviator

References

See also
Ari (name)

Hypocorisms
Dutch masculine given names
Hebrew masculine given names